= Famatanca =

Coordinates: 26°46′S 66°05′W

- Municipality and village
- Interactive map of Famatanca
- Country: Argentina
- Province: Catamarca Province
- Time zone: UTC−3 (ART)

Famatanca is a village and municipality in Catamarca Province in northwestern Argentina.
